Max Linde (14 June 1862 – 23 April 1940, in Lübeck) was an ophthalmologist who is best known as a patron and art collector of the early 20th century. He was an important patron of the painter Edvard Munch, among others. He had the most extensive private collection of sculptures by Auguste Rodin in Germany. In 1903 he commissioned a monumental cast of Rodin's The Thinker. Munch painted The Thinker in his garden in 1907. His brothers Hermann and Heinrich were painters.

Works
 Max Linde: Edvard Munch und die Kunst der Zukunft, Berlin 1902

References

Further reading
 Otto Grautoff: Lübeck, Reihe Stätten der Kultur, Vol. 9, Leipzig 1908, p. 156 ff
 Carl Georg Heise: Edvard Munch und seine Beziehungen zu Lübeck, in: Der Wagen 1927, p. 82-90
 Friedrich v. Rohden: Von alten Lübecker Ärzten, in: Der Wagen 1960, p. 83 (90ff)
 Lothar Linde: Erinnerungen an Marie Linde, in: Der Wagen 1961, p. 101 ff
 Arne Eggum: Der Linde-Fries - Edvard Munch und sein erster deutscher Mäzen, Dr. Max Linde, aus dem Norwegischen von Alken Bruns, Veröffentlichung XX des Senat der Hansestadt Lübeck - Amt für Kultur, Lübeck 1982
 Stefan Pucks: Linde, Maximilian (Max) in: Biographisches Lexikon für Schleswig-Holstein und Lübeck, Band 11, Neumünster 2000, pp. 230–233 , korrigierte

External links

 
 Exhibition Kunst und Mäzenatentum Lübeck 1997

1862 births
1940 deaths
Physicians from Lübeck
German art collectors
19th-century art collectors
20th-century art collectors
German ophthalmologists